Cymindis borealis is a species of ground beetle in the subfamily Harpalinae. It was described by John Lawrence LeConte in 1863.

References

borealis
Beetles described in 1863